Haberdashers' Abraham Darby Academy in Telford, Shropshire, England, is an exceptional coeducational secondary school on Ironbridge Road in Madeley which was founded in 1937. It is named after Abraham Darby III and is situated  one mile from the Iron Bridge which he built in 1779. In September 2008 the school was converted to an academy through a link to Haberdashers' Adams, and was accepted by the Department for Children, Schools and Families (DCSF). The headmaster is Mr Lee Hadley.

History
The school was founded as Madeley Senior Council School, Hill Top, opened in 1927 with 400 mixed places. It became known as Madeley Modern School from 1944, was enlarged in 1958-59 and had 619 pupils by the end of 1959.

It amalgamated with Coalbrookdale High School in 1965 to form the Abraham Darby Comprehensive School. There were 1,244 pupils in 1980.  
The school has a musical tradition, particularly with the wind band and the Abraham Darby Showband, which has played in the Royal Albert Hall and at the Carnegie Hall in New York City. The school achieved Arts College status and again renamed itself, this time to the Abraham Darby School for the Performing Arts in 2003.

The new building began construction in late 2009 and completed in 2012. It was officially opened by Prince Edward on 11 October 2012.

The school's name was changed in early 2018 from Abraham Darby Academy to Haberdashers' Abraham Darby. To quash rumours and 'gossip' about the school's name change, a letter was sent to parents in which principal Lee Hadley stated, “In order to strengthen and highlight our partnership with Adams, to link us more obviously with other Haberdasher schools across the country and to emphasise the role of Haberdashers’ Company, governors have decided the Haberdasher name should have more prominence. I wholeheartedly support this.”

Academy
Links between Abraham Darby and Haberdashers' Adams at Newport are being developed, with student and teacher exchanges, leadership training, mentoring systems, and a common house system. There will be joint events, including those for sport, music, and drama. The curriculum is supported by ICT, however, each school will have specialisms: Abraham Darby with performing arts and possibly business and enterprise; Adams with technology and modern languages.

The joint project is supported by Telford and Wrekin Council, the DCSF, and the 300-year-old Haberdashers' Company as a sponsor. The two schools, although operating separately, will share governors. Part of the project will be a capital investment, and new school building by 2011.

Abraham Darby student uniform comprises a tie, and a blazer bearing the Haberdashers’ crest, almost identical to that of Adams, with the difference being a newer style of tie, introduced in late 2016.

Notable alumni

 Former English super-middleweight professional boxer Richie Woodhall (attended during the 1980s).

Madeley Modern School
 Billy Wright, the former captain of Wolverhampton Wanderers F.C. and the England football team.

Coalbrookdale County High School
 Louis Kirby, political journalist, and editor from 1980 to 1986 of the London Evening Standard, and from 1974 to 1980 of The Evening News.
 Dame Lorna Muirhead, former president of the Royal College of Midwives and Lord Lieutenant of Merseyside since 2006.
 Edith Pargeter OBE, author who wrote The Cadfael Chronicles between 1977 and 1994, which are set in Shropshire.

References

External links
Abraham Darby homepage
 Abraham Darby Academy bands
 History

Academies in Telford and Wrekin
Secondary schools in Telford and Wrekin
Schools in Telford